The 2022 New York's 23rd congressional district special election was a special election held on August 23, 2022. The seat became vacant after incumbent Republican representative Tom Reed resigned on May 10, 2022.

Candidates

Republican Party

Nominee
 Joe Sempolinski, chairman of the Steuben County Republican Committee

Declined
 George Borrello, state senator from the 57th district
 Marc Cenedella, CEO of Ladders, Inc. and former candidate for this seat in the regular election
Mike Sigler, Tompkins County legislator

Did not run
Nick Langworthy, Chair of the New York Republican State Committee, former Chair of the Erie County Republican Party, and nominee for this seat in the regular election
Carl Paladino, former member of the Buffalo Public Schools Board, millionaire developer, nominee for Governor of New York in 2010, and candidate for this seat in the regular election primary

Democratic Party

Nominee
Max Della Pia, U.S. Air Force veteran, community leader, and Chair of the Tioga County Democratic Committee. Della Pia is also the candidate for this seat in the general election.

Others
Rich Moon, pharmacist, unsuccessfully sought Republican nomination and ran as a write-in candidate

Endorsements

General election

Predictions

Fundraising

Results

See also
2022 United States House of Representatives elections
2022 United States elections
117th United States Congress
List of special elections to the United States House of Representatives

References

New York 2022 23
New York 2022 23
2022 23 special
New York 23 Special
United States House of Representatives 23 Special
United States House of Representatives 2022 23